Eufrosina Hinard also Hisnard (1777after 1819), was a businesswoman who lived in New Orleans and Pensacola, Florida. Hinard, a free mixed-race woman, owned and bought slaves and allowed them to purchase their own freedom.

Biography 
Hinard was born in 1777 in New Orleans to a freed black slave. Her father was a free white man, and as Hinard's mother had been freed, Hinard was also born free. 

In 1791, she was placéed to Nicolás María Vidal, a legal counselor to the governor of Spanish Louisiana. She had two daughters with Vidal: Carolina Maria Salome and Maria Josefa de las Mercedes. Although Vidal was not listed on the children's baptism records, Hisnard and Vidal's daughters were accepted as part of Vidal's social circle without scandal.

Hinard and her daughters lived in New Orleans until 1803, when it was ceded to the French at which time they moved with Vidal to Pensacola, Florida. 

When Vidal died in 1806, he left his estate and his slaves to Hinard and her daughters. Fighting for the estate was not easy and led to Hinard and her daughters confronting Andrew Jackson over the controversy. 

Hinard rented out her slaves and purchased more slaves. While it was becoming difficult, if not impossible, for slaves to purchase their own freedom from their owners in the United States, Hinard still allowed the practice with her own slaves after the Spanish areas of New Orleans and Florida were ceded to the U.S. Hinard considered her slaveholding as a "business practice, not a human condition." Her slaves could pay their purchase price, plus interest, in order to earn their freedom. Hinard also owned a brickworks in Florida. 

Hinard is the fourth-great-grandmother to Creole chef Leah Chase.

References 

1777 births
Date of death unknown
Date of death missing
People from New Orleans
People from Pensacola, Florida
American slave owners
American slave traders
Spanish slave traders
19th-century American businesspeople
19th-century American businesswomen
People of Colonial Spanish Louisiana
People of Spanish Florida
Black slave owners in the United States
American women slave owners
Free people of color